Heads Up is a 1925 American silent comedy adventure film directed by Harry Garson and starring Maurice 'Lefty' Flynn, Kathleen Myers, and Kalla Pasha.

Plot
As described in a film magazine review, a young son of wealth who longs for freedom from the conventions of his home is sent to South America on a secret mission for a group of oil men. He becomes entangled in love and a revolution, and, after a series of swift adventures, wins the affections of the young woman and the war.

Cast

References

Bibliography
 Connelly, Robert B. The Silents: Silent Feature Films, 1910-36, Volume 40, Issue 2. December Press, 1998.
 Munden, Kenneth White. The American Film Institute Catalog of Motion Pictures Produced in the United States, Part 1. University of California Press, 1997.

External links
 

1925 films
1925 adventure films
1925 comedy films
1920s English-language films
American silent feature films
1920s adventure comedy films
American adventure comedy films
American black-and-white films
Films directed by Harry Garson
Film Booking Offices of America films
1920s American films
Silent American comedy films
Silent adventure comedy films